The dark hawk-cuckoo (Hierococcyx bocki) is a bird in the family Cuculidae formerly considered conspecific with the large hawk-cuckoo (Hierococcyx sparverioides) and placed in the Cuculus genus.

Geographic Range

In Malaysia it occurs in upper Malaya, northern Sarawak and Sabah. In Indonesia it is found on Sumatra and in Kalimantan. It is also found in Brunei.

References

dark hawk-cuckoo
Birds of Malesia
dark hawk-cuckoo
dark hawk-cuckoo